Oujda-Angad Prefecture is an urban prefecture located within the Oriental Region, of northeast Morocco. The north of the province is a part from the historical region of Béni Iznassen tribes ( Aït Iznassen ).

The prefecture had a population of 551,767 in 2014.

Geography
The prefecture's eastern boundary is along Algeria−Morocco border.

The city of Oujda is the capital of Oujda-Angad Prefecture and the Oriental Region.

Municipalities
Bni Drar 
Naïma 
Oujda

Rural communes
Ahl Angad 
Ain Sfa 
Bni Khaled 
Bsara 
Isly 
Mestferki 
Sidi Boulenouar 
Sidi Moussa Lemhaya

See also

References

Prefectures of Morocco
Geography of Oriental (Morocco)